UN Youth Australia is a national youth-led organisation which seeks to educate and empower young Australians on global issues and foster an understanding of the work of the United Nations, human rights and International relations in young Australians. The organisation is fully operated by volunteers who have left high school and are under the age of 24, over 15,000 young people participate in UN Youth Australia’s programs, activities and events each year.

UN Youth Australia is affiliated with, but is not a division of or run by, the United Nations Association of Australia which has a consultative status with ECOSOC as a member of the World Federation of United Nations Associations. UN Youth also works closely with The Australian Department of Foreign Affairs and Trade on the annual Australian Youth Representative to the United Nations program.

UN Youth is a federated organisation overseen by the Board of Directors which appoint a National Executive, with divisions in each state and territory overseen by independent executives. Each division is run independently and collaborate to organise national events and programs.

Activities

UN Youth Australia is run entirely by a team of over 1,000 volunteers aged under 25.

National Activities 
UN Youth Australia holds three annual national events: the UN Youth National Conference, the National Finals of the Evatt Competition, a UN Security Council Competition named after Dr H.V. Evatt, and the National Finals of the Voice Competition, a public speaking competition. Participants in these conferences are students from secondary schools across Australia. The conferences are held in Australian capital cities designated on a rotational system.

National Conference 
National Conference is a week-long educational conference for students in year 9 to 12, held in a different capital city each year. Each State and Territory division of UN Youth Australia, UN Youth New Zealand and some international organisations send delegates to National Conference.

Evatt Competition 
UN Youth Australia and its State and Territory divisions organises one of the largest high school tournaments in Australia: the National Evatt Competition which is a UN Security Council Model United Nations competition named after the distinguished Australian politician, diplomat and jurist Dr H.V. Evatt.

Voice Competition 
Voice is a public speaking competition for students in years 7 to 10. Student are asked to pitch a solution to a social, economic or political problem, and then answer impromptu questions from the judges.

International Activities 
In addition to domestic conferences, UN Youth Australia also operates six international tours.

American Political Tour 
Each year in January, a delegation of secondary school students tours the United States, meeting US and UN officials in Washington, D.C. and New York.

Young Diplomats Tour 
Also in January, UN Youth Australia sends a delegation of 16 secondary school students to visit the United Nations Office in Vienna as part of a European tour focusing on international relations, modern history, and organisations in Europe relevant to global politics.

Timor-Leste Project 
In July UN Youth Australia runs the Pacific Project which, in partnership with Destination Dreaming, arranges for secondary school students to visit development projects, meet diplomats, see NGO operations first hand, and have a chance to experience life in East Timor.

Aotearoa Leadership Tour 
Also in July, the organisation sends a delegation of secondary school students on the Aotearoa Leadership Tour which promotes interculturalism and engagement between indigenous and non-indigenous young Australians through a tour of New Zealand focusing on Māori culture and Maori-Pākehā relations, organised in close collaboration with UN Youth New Zealand.

Middle East Experience 
In 2015, UN Youth Australia began the Middle East Experience program, in which secondary school delegates tour 2 countries in the region.

Emerging Leaders Program 
In 2019, UN Youth Australia launched the Emerging Leaders Program, in which 16 secondary students from all over Australia tour Japan, South Korea and China.

Divisional Activities 
Divisions of UN Youth Australia also coordinate events in their State or Territory, such as annual State Conferences and divisional rounds of the Evatt Competition, Voice Competition, educative school visits and speakers forums.

Australian Youth Representative to the United Nations

Each year since 1999, UN Youth Australia works with the Department of Foreign Affairs and Trade to select and support a Youth Representative to the United Nations General Assembly. The Youth Representative holds an extensive, nationwide consultation tour to engage with and discover the issues that are most important to young Australians, and travels to New York as an accredited member of the Australian Mission to represent Australian youth at the United Nations.

Office holders

References

External links

World Federation of United Nations Associations
Australia
Youth in Australia
Youth organisations based in Australia